Khet may refer to:
KHET, a PBS station in Hawaii
Khet (game), an abstract strategy game
Heth (letter) or Khet, a letter of many Semitic alphabets
Khet, the Thai word for district in Bangkok
Khet, an Ancient Egyptian unit of measurement
Khet, an Ancient Egyptian concept of the soul or spirit